tert-Butylthiol, also known as 2-methylpropane-2-thiol, 2-methyl-2-propanethiol, tert-butyl mercaptan (TBM), and t-BuSH, is an organosulfur compound with the formula (CH3)3CSH.  This thiol is used as an odorant for natural gas, which is otherwise odorless.  It may also have been used as a flavoring agent.

Preparation
At least one publication has listed tert-butylthiol as a very minor component of cooked potatoes, but because the tert-butyl moiety is very rare in natural products, other sources doubt the existence of natural sources of the compound. It was first prepared in 1890 by Leonard Dobbin by the reaction of zinc sulfide and t-butyl chloride.

The compound was later prepared in 1932 by the reaction of the Grignard reagent, t-BuMgCl, with sulfur to give the corresponding thiolate, followed by hydrolysis. This preparation is shown below:

t-BuMgCl  +  S   →   t-BuSMgCl
t-BuSMgCl  +  H2O   →   t-BuSH  +  Mg(OH)Cl

It is currently prepared industrially by the reaction of isobutylene with hydrogen sulfide over a clay (silica alumina) catalyst.

Reactions
tert-Butylthiol can react with metal alkoxides and acyl chlorides to form thiol esters, as shown in the equation:

In the reaction above, thallium(I) ethoxide converts to thallium(I) t-butylthiolate.   In the presence of diethyl ether, thallium(I) t-butylthiolate reacts with acyl chlorides to give the corresponding tert-butyl thioesters.  Like other thioesters, it reverts to tert-butylthiol by hydrolysis.

Lithium 2-methylpropane-2-thiolate can be prepared by treatment of tert-butylthiol with lithium hydride in an aprotic solvent such as hexamethylphosphoramide (HMPA).  The resulting thiolate salt is a useful demethylating reagent.  For example, treatment with 7-methylguanosine gives guanosine.  Other N-methylated nucleosides in tRNA are not demethylated by this reagent.

Metal complexes
The anion derived from tert-butylthiol forms complexes with various metals.  One example is tetrakis(tert-butylthiolato)molybdenum(IV), Mo(t-BuS)4.  This complex was prepared by treating MoCl4 with t-BuSLi:

MoCl4  +  4 t-BuSLi   →   Mo(t-BuS)4  +  4 LiCl

Mo(t-BuS)4 is a dark red diamagnetic complex that is sensitive to air and moisture. The molybdenum center has a distorted tetrahedral coordination to four sulfur atoms, with overall D2 symmetry.

Safety
Even in well ventilated areas, extreme caution must be made when handling tert-butylthiol as it is a highly odorous chemical with an odor threshold of <0.33 ppb.  Extreme caution is not due to toxicity, but due to the significant odor and the concern this odor could cause to individuals that might be exposed.  The PEL for thiols of most types is 500 ppb, primarily due to reaction of nausea at levels of 2–3 ppm.

Commercial use
tert-Butylthiol is the main ingredient in many gas odorant blends. These blends are used only with natural gas and not propane, as the boiling points of these blends and propane are quite different. Because propane is delivered as a liquid and vaporizes to gas when it is delivered to the appliance, the vapor liquid equilibrium would substantially reduce the amount of odorant blend in the vapor.

tert-Butylthiol has been listed on the European Food Safety Authority (FL-no: 12.174) as a flavor additive.  There is no indication of what flavor(s) it may have been used in.  It has been removed from this list.

See also
 Butanethiol (butyl mercaptan)
 Ethanethiol (ethyl mercaptan)

References

Alkanethiols
Tert-butyl compounds
Foul-smelling chemicals